H. Duke may refer to:

Heather Duke, a character in the 1989 American film Heathers
Henry Duke, 1st Baron Merrivale (1855–1939), British judge and Conservative politician
Henry Duke (police officer), chief inspector with the City of London Police and Olympic tug of war competitor

See also
Harry Dukes (1912–1988), an English professional footballer